Zoë Tapper (born 26 October 1981) is an English actress who first came to prominence playing Nell Gwynne in Richard Eyre's award-winning film Stage Beauty in 2004. She is known for portraying Anya Raczynski in Survivors and Mina Harker in Demons.

Early life and education 
Tapper was born in Bromley, Kent. She trained at the Academy Drama School and the Central School of Speech and Drama, from which she graduated in the spring of 2003, days before taking on her first film role.

Career 
On stage Tapper has appeared in Epitaph for George Dillon in the West End, and Othello at Shakespeare's Globe.

Following her film debut in Stage Beauty, Tapper played Gwendolyn in Mrs. Palfrey at the Claremont (2005), alongside Joan Plowright, and Diana Shaw in These Foolish Things (2006), alongside Anjelica Huston.

Her television credits include Mary Collins in A Harlot's Progress for Channel 4, Jane in Oliver Parker's The Private Life of Samuel Pepys, Gemma in the first series of the Sky One drama Hex and Jenny Maple in the BBC miniseries Twenty Thousand Streets Under the Sky. She also played Hermia in ShakespeaRe-Told: A Midsummer Night's Dream, the 2005 BBC adaptation/modernisation of Shakespeare's play of the same name.

In 2008 Tapper portrayed Sheila Steafel in the BBC television play The Curse of Steptoe and Anya Raczynski in the BBC remake of Survivors, alongside Max Beesley, Paterson Joseph and Julie Graham. She also played Selina Dawes in the ITV adaptation of the novel Affinity, opposite Anna Madeley as Margaret Prior. It premiered at the Miami Gay & Lesbian Film Festival, and in the UK on 28 December 2008 on ITV.

In 2009 she appeared in the ITV fantasy drama series Demons as blind vampire-turned-monster hunter Mina Harker. She played Effie Gray in the BBC Two period drama Desperate Romantics. In 2010, she played Hannah in the BBC television pilot Reunited.

In 2013 Tapper starred as Ellen Love in Mr Selfridge.

Personal life 

Tapper has one brother. She is married to the actor Oliver Dimsdale. In 2011, they had a daughter.

Television

Video games

References

External links 

English television actresses
English film actresses
English stage actresses
English radio actresses
English Shakespearean actresses
Alumni of the Royal Central School of Speech and Drama
Alumni of the Academy Drama School
People from Bromley
Actresses from London
1981 births
Living people
Actresses from Kent